The Memphis Belle: A Story of a Flying Fortress is a 1944 documentary film which provides an account of the final mission of the crew of the Memphis Belle, a Boeing B-17 Flying Fortress. In May 1943 it became the third U.S. Army Air Forces heavy bomber to complete 25 missions over Europe, but the first to return to the United States.

The dramatic 16 mm color film of actual battles was made by three cinematographers, including First Lieutenant Harold J. Tannenbaum. Tannenbaum, a veteran of World War I, was killed in action during the filming when the bomber he was in was shot down over France on April 16, 1943.

The film was directed by Major William Wyler, narrated by Eugene Kern, and had scenes at its station, RAF Bassingbourn, photographed by Hollywood cinematographer Captain William H. Clothier. It was made under the auspices of the First Motion Picture Unit, part of the United States Army Air Forces. The film actually depicted the next to last mission of the crew (see below) on May 15, 1943, and was made as a morale-building inspiration for the Home Front by showing the everyday courage of the men who manned these bombers.

Cast
The crew on the missions filmed included:
 Captain Robert K. Morgan (pilot)
 Captain James A. Verinis (co-pilot)
 Captain Vincent B. Evans (bombardier)
 Captain Charles B. Leighton (navigator)
 Technical Sergeant Robert J. Hanson (radio operator)
 Technical Sergeant James Kinard (engineer and top gunner)
 Technical Sergeant Harold Loch
 Staff Sergeant Casimer A. Nastal (waist gunner)
 Staff Sergeant John P. Quinlan (tail gunner)
 Staff Sergeant Cecil H. Scott (ball turret gunner)
 Staff Sergeant Clarence E. Winchell (waist gunner)

Production
Morgan's crew had not flown all of its missions together. Captain Verinis had originally been Morgan's co-pilot at the beginning of their combat tour but had become a "first pilot" (aircraft commander) in his own right on December 30, 1942, after which he flew 16 missions as commander of a replacement B-17 he named Connecticut Yankee after his home state. Verinis finished his tour two days before the rest of Morgan's crew.

Nor was Morgan's crew the one originally selected by Wyler for filming. He had been following Captain Oscar O'Neill (whose bomber was named Invasion 2nd) of the 401st Bomb Squadron until O'Neill's B-17 and five others of the 401st were shot down over Bremen, Germany, on April 17, 1943, at that time the most costly mission yet for the Eighth Air Force. Morgan was then selected and his crew re-united by the Eighth Air Force to complete its tour together and to return to the United States for a war bond drive. Wyler also informed Morgan when asked that, had the Memphis Belle been shot down on the crew's final mission, Wyler had a backup crew working with another B-17 about to finish its 25 missions, Hell's Angels of the nearby 303d Bombardment Group. Hell's Angels actually completed 25 missions first, on May 13 (the date of the 19th for the Memphis Belle).

Morgan states in his memoirs that he was approached by Wyler in late January 1943 after his crew's eighth mission. Wyler told Morgan he wanted to film the Memphis Belle and her crew because of "a certain mystique" to the aircraft's nickname, and that Morgan's reputation as a pilot meant that Wyler would be "in the center of the action...(with) a pretty good chance of coming back." Morgan agreed after assurances from Wyler that the film crew would not interfere with operation of the airplane in combat in any way.

The first mission flown in filming was not aboard the Memphis Belle, but aboard the B-17 Jersey Bounce on a February 26, 1943, mission to Wilhelmshaven, Germany. The Memphis Belle was being repaired after severe battle damage incurred on February 16. The mission experienced heavy German fighter attacks and two of the 91st group's B-17s were shot down. Despite the hazards, Wyler filmed at least six more combat missions with Morgan's crew, not all of them aboard the Memphis Belle, using a set-up that placed mounted cameras in the nose, tail, right waist, and radio hatch positions. The camera setup is documented in the photograph of the Bad Penny, which Morgan and Wyler flew on a mission to Antwerp on April 5, 1943. Other bombing runs from the film have been geolocated to Saint-Nazaire, Lorient, and Rennes in France.

The 16 mm color film used did not include sound, and this was added later in Hollywood. The original crew, during their war bonds drive in the United States, made typical appropriate comments to each other while watching the silent movie in a studio. The result was difficult to distinguish from real combat recordings.

King George VI (wearing the uniform of a Marshal of the Royal Air Force) and his consort Queen Elizabeth are seen congratulating the crew on May 18, after Morgan's final mission but the day before that of the B-17.

Reception
In The New York Times review of the documentary, critic Bosley Crowther praised the film as "A thorough and vivid comprehension of what a daylight bombing is actually like for the young men who wing our heavy bombers from English bases into the heart of Germany..."

Impact
In 2001, the United States Library of Congress deemed the original version "culturally significant" and selected it for preservation in the National Film Registry.

The Memphis Belle aircraft is now preserved at the National Museum of the United States Air Force at Wright-Patterson AFB, near Dayton, Ohio.

1990 film
A picture of the story, Memphis Belle, was produced in 1990 by David Puttnam in England. It was co-produced by Catherine Wyler, the daughter of William Wyler, directed by Michael Caton-Jones and starred Matthew Modine and Eric Stoltz. The movie  still had fiction, for example the crew's names.

Home video
In 2010, the film was released in high definition on Blu-ray disc by Periscope Film LLC. It is also included with the 2014 Blu-ray release of the 1990 Memphis Belle.

2016 restoration

In 2016 documentary filmmaker Eric Nelson became aware that the 34 reels of raw footage William Wyler used to cut the film were available in the United States National Archives and Records Administration. He led a team that laboriously replaced the scratched and faded frames with the unscratched frames.  After the restoration was finished he used the 90 hours of film on those 34 reels to cut a new documentary, entitled The Cold Blue.

See also
 "Jersey Bounce", the song that inspired naming of several World War II bombers

There are connections with Twelve o'Clock High. The Memphis Belle flew in the 91st bomb group of the Eighth Air Force. The bomb group of Twelve o'Clock High is the 918th. During the briefing for the last Memphis Belle mission one of the planes in the mission is commanded by a pilot named Lay. Bernie Lay is both the writer of 12 o'Clock High and flew missions for the Eighth Air Force.

References

Notes

Bibliography

 Dolan Edward F. Jr. Hollywood Goes to War. London: Bison Books, 1985. .
 Evans, Alun. Brassey's Guide to War Films. Dulles, Virginia: Potomac Books, 2000. .
 Freeman, Roger A. The Mighty Eighth War Diary. St. Paul, Minnesota: Motorbooks International, 1990. .
 Harwick, Jack and Ed Schnepf. "A Viewer's Guide to Aviation Movies". The Making of the Great Aviation Films, General Aviation Series, Volume 2, 1989.
 Morgan, Robert, and Ron Powers. The Man Who Flew the Memphis Belle. New York: Penguin Putnam, 2001. .
 Orriss, Bruce. When Hollywood Ruled the Skies: The Aviation Film Classics of World War II. Hawthorne, California: Aero Associates Inc., 1984. .

External links 
 
 
 The Memphis Belle: A Story of a Flying Fortress at the Library of Congress
 Online US Archive Copy of The Memphis Belle Documentary

1944 films
American documentary films
Documentary films about military aviation
Films directed by William Wyler
Films scored by Gail Kubik
United States National Film Registry films
First Motion Picture Unit films
Films about the United States Army Air Forces
1944 documentary films
Black-and-white documentary films
Boeing B-17 Flying Fortress
American black-and-white films
1940s American films